Yasnaya Polyana is a rural locality (a selo) and the administrative centre of Yasnopolyansky Selsoviet, Kizlyarsky District, Republic of Dagestan, Russia. The population was 1,671 as of 2010. There are 8 streets.

Geography 
Yasnaya Polyana is located 13 km northeast of Kizlyar (the district's administrative centre) by road. Dalneye and Kenafnyy Zavod are the nearest rural localities.

Nationalities 
Avars live there.

References 

Rural localities in Kizlyarsky District